The 2005 Croatia Open Umag was a men's tennis tournament played on outdoor clay courts. It was the 16th edition of the Croatia Open Umag, and was part of the International Series of the 2005 ATP Tour. It took place at the International Tennis Center in Umag, Croatia, from 25 July through 31 July 2005. Second-seeded Guillermo Coria won the singles title.

Finals

Singles

 Guillermo Coria defeated  Carlos Moyá 6–2, 4–6, 6–2
 It was Coria's 1st singles title of the year, and the 9th and last of his career.

Doubles

 Jiří Novák /  Petr Pála defeated  Michal Mertiňák /  David Škoch, 6–3, 6–3
 It was Novák's 1st title of the year and the 17th of his career. It was Pála's 1st title of the year and the 4th of his career.

References

External links
 Official website
 ITF tournament edition details
 ATP tournament profile

Croatia Open Umag
2005
Croatian Open